Racists is a 2006 novel by Kunal Basu about a scientific experiment in the mid-19th century in which a white girl and a black boy are raised together as savages on a small uninhabited island off the coast of Africa. The long-term experiment is devised by the "racists" of the title, two rival scientists—one British, one French—to once and for all settle the question of racial superiority.

Plot
Two scientists decide to settle the question of racial superiority by leaving two children—a white girl and black boy—alone on an island to be raised without speaking by only a nurse, Norah. The British scientist Samuel Bates believes that the girl will emerge as the leader, while the French scientist Jean-Louis Belavoix believes that the two races can not live in peace and the children will ultimately murder each other. The experiment begins to run into problems when Bates and Belavoix argue about the validity of cranial measurements. Meanwhile, Bates's long suffering assistant Nicholas Quartley falls in love with Norah and decides to rescue her from the island.

See also

 Feral children
 Scientific racism
 Craniometry (the method used by the English scientist, a craniologist, to prove the white girl's superiority)

Reviews
 Mike Phillips (The Guardian)
 Rashmee Roshan Lall (The Times of India)
 Maya Khankhoje
 Pranoti Chirmuley

References

2006 Indian novels
Indian historical novels
Novels about racism
Novels set in Africa
Novels set on islands